KYSM-FM (103.5 FM, "Country 103.5") is an American radio station licensed to Mankato and serving the Minnesota River Valley. The station currently airs a country music format.

Country 103.5 was purchased by Three Eagles Communications from its previous owner, Clear Channel Communications in August 2007, and then by Digity, LLC on September 12, 2014. Sister stations include KEEZ, KRBI-FM and KMKO-FM.

History
KYSM-FM first went on the air January 31, 1948, on 103.5 MHz. John F. Meagher was general manager of the station and its sister station, KYSM.

References

External links
Country 103 KYSM-FM official website

Country radio stations in the United States
Radio stations in Minnesota
Mankato, Minnesota
Radio stations established in 1948
1948 establishments in Minnesota